Andrew Heywood is a British author of textbooks on politics and political science.

Bibliography 
 Political Ideologies: An Introduction (1992, Palgrave MacMillan)
 Political Ideas and Concepts: An Introduction  (1994, Palgrave MacMillan)
 Political Theory: An Introduction, first appeared as Political Ideas and Concepts: An Introduction  (1994, Palgrave MacMillan)
 Politics (1997, Palgrave MacMillan)
 Key Concepts in Politics (2000, Palgrave MacMillan)
 British Politics (2008, Palgrave MacMillan)
 Essentials of UK Politics (2008, Palgrave MacMillan)
 Global Politics (2011, Palgrave MacMillan)
 Key Concepts in Politics and International Relations (2015, Palgrave)
 Essentials of UK Politics: For AS and A-Level (2017, Palgrave)

See also
 Mike Arrington

References

External links
 

Year of birth missing (living people)
Living people
British male writers